Kako is a town in Jehanabad district of Bihar, a state in northeastern India. Until 1984, Kako was a part of the Gaya district. In 2010, the town's state representation was shifted from the Jehanabad constituency to the Ghosi constituency of Bihar's Vidhan Sabha (legislative assembly). Though the population density is very high, the basic infrastructure is not optimal.

Demographics 

Kako is located in the Jehanabad district, Bihar state. Kako has a population of 3,554 families, with 23,037 people in all: 11,890 male, 11,147 are female. Children under the age of 6 make up 18.08% of the total population (around 4165 children). In 2011, the literacy rate of Kako was 67.22% compared to 61.80% in the state. In Kako, literacy for males stands at 76.77%, above female at 57.02%.

Geography

The climate ranges from very hot in summer to very cold in winter. The soil is very fertile, known locally as Kemal.

National Highway 110 passes through Kako.

Agriculture

Most of the people of Kako depend on agriculture. The main crops are rice, wheat and pulses (a type of legume harvested for its dry seed). The land is very fertile, and there are ponds useful to agriculture. Some people are also engaged in vegetable farming.

Tourism  

Bibi Kamal's Urs takes place in November every year when cooked rice with milk " Kheer " is distributed among devotees seeking her blessings.
Sun temple – The Sun temple draws many locals to Kako during the Vedic festival of Chatth Puja.
The Archaeological Survey of India has petitioned UNESCO for the inclusion of Barabar hills in the world heritage list of monuments.
Nalanda – Famous for "KUND" of Sufi saint Makhdoom Sharfuddin Yahya Maneri R.A. and a Buddhist tourist attraction in Rajigir,  from Kako.
 Ramayana Circuit – As per local legends and the epic Ramayana, Lord Ram's stepmother, Rani Kekaiy of Ayodhya, lived there for some time, and the village took its name after her.

References

Villages in Jehanabad district